Saratoga School District No. 11 was a school district headquartered in Saratoga, Arkansas. The mascot was the bulldog.

The former Washington School District was dissolved on July 1, 1990, with some of its territory given to the Saratoga school district. On July 1, 2004, the Saratoga district consolidated into the Mineral Springs School District.

References

Further reading
 (Download)

External links
 
Financial reports:
 Saratoga School District No. 11 Hempstead County, Arkansas General Purpose Financial Statements and Other Reports June 30, 2000
 Saratoga School District No. 11 Hempstead County, Arkansas General Purpose Financial Statements and Other Reports June 30, 2001
 Saratoga School District No. 11 Hempstead County, Arkansas General Purpose Financial Statements and Other Reports June 30, 2003

2004 disestablishments in Arkansas
School districts disestablished in 2004
Defunct school districts in Arkansas
Education in Howard County, Arkansas